Abdoulaye Soulama (29 November 1979 – 27 October 2017) was a Burkinabé international footballer.

Career
In the 2001-2002 football season, Soulama played for Turkish side Denizlispor. He played successful matches at the club which made it to the UEFA Cup that season. Unfortunately, some Turkish players, including team captain Tolunay Kafkas, wanted coach Sakip Ozberk to give the starting spot to Turkish substitute Suleyman Kucuk. At a cup match against Fenerbahçe SK, Tolunay punched Soulama in the face and got a red card. However, despite being reduced to 10 men, Denizlispor managed to pull a surprise and defeat their opponent 2–1. At the end of the season Soulama left the club.

In August 2007, Soulama joined Ghanaian side Asante Kotoko.

In December 2014, Soulama joined Ghanaian side Hearts of Oak SC.

International career
Soulama was a member of the Burkinabé 2004 African Nations Cup team, who finished bottom of their group in the first round of competition, thus failing to secure qualification for the quarter-finals. After about five years absence from the national side he was recalled in 2012 for a 16 May exhibition match against  Benin national football team  and next month's 2014 FIFA World Cup double-header qualifiers against Congo and Gabon.

Honours
On 5 July 2008 Soulama  was nominated as Goalkeeper of the Year 2008 in Ghana.

Death
Soulama died of cancer on 27 October 2017.

References

1979 births
2017 deaths
Burkinabé footballers
Burkinabé expatriate footballers
Burkina Faso international footballers
1998 African Cup of Nations players
2000 African Cup of Nations players
2004 African Cup of Nations players
2013 Africa Cup of Nations players
Association football goalkeepers
Expatriate footballers in Algeria
Burkinabé expatriate sportspeople in Algeria
Expatriate footballers in Turkey
Asante Kotoko S.C. players
Denizlispor footballers
Expatriate footballers in Ghana
Burkinabé expatriate sportspeople in Turkey
Burkinabé expatriate sportspeople in Ghana
ASFA Yennenga players
Accra Hearts of Oak S.C. players
CA Batna players
Süper Lig players
People from Cascades Region
2015 Africa Cup of Nations players
Sportspeople from Ouagadougou
21st-century Burkinabé people
Deaths from cancer